Porphyria cutanea tarda is the most common subtype of porphyria. The disease is named because it is a porphyria that often presents with skin manifestations later in life. The disorder results from low levels of the enzyme responsible for the fifth step in heme production. Heme is a vital molecule for all of the body's organs. It is a component of hemoglobin, the molecule that carries oxygen in the blood.

Hepatoerythropoietic porphyria has been described as a homozygous form of porphyria cutanea tarda, although it can also be caused if two different mutations occur at the same locus.

Symptoms and signs
Porphyria cutanea tarda (PCT) is recognized as the most prevalent subtype of porphyritic diseases.

PCT is characterized by onycholysis and blistering of the skin in areas that receive higher levels of exposure to sunlight.  The primary cause is a deficiency of uroporphyrinogen decarboxylase (UROD), a cytosolic enzyme that is a step in the enzymatic pathway that leads to the synthesis of heme. Behind the direct cause there are a number of genetic and environmental risk factors.

Patients who are diagnosed with PCT typically seek treatment following the development of photosensitivities causing blisters and erosions on exposed areas of the skin. This is usually observed in the face, hands, forearms, and lower legs. Healing is slow and leaves scarring. Though blisters are the most common skin manifestations of PCT, other skin manifestations include hyperpigmentation (similar to a tan) and hypertrichosis (mainly on the cheeks) also occur. PCT is a chronic condition, with external symptoms often subsiding and recurring as a result of multiple factors.  In addition to the skin lesions, chronic liver disease is very common in patients with sporadic PCT.  This involves hepatic fibrosis (scarring of the liver), and inflammation. However, liver problems are less common in patients with the inherited form of the disease. Additionally, patients will often void a wine-red color urine with an increased concentration of uroporphyrin I due to their enzymatic deficiency.

Vitamin, mineral, and enzyme deficiencies
Certain vitamin and minerals deficiencies are common in people with porphyria cutanea tarda.  The most common deficiencies are beta-Carotene, retinol, vitamin A and vitamin C.  Beta-Carotene is required to synthesize vitamin A and vitamin A is needed to synthesize retinol.  A lack of retinol-binding protein is due to a lack of retinol which is required to trigger its production.

Porphyrins interact with iron, absorbing photons to create reactive oxygen species is the mechanism of action causing the itchy, painful blisters of PCT.  The reactive oxygen species consume the skin antioxidants beta-carotene, vitamin E, and vitamin C.  Supplementation of these three vitamins reduces the oxidation and potentially diminishes the severity of blister formation.  No single one of the three vitamins can inhibit the damaging effects of oxidized porphyrins, specifically uroporphyrins and coproporphyrins, but all three working together synergistically are capable of neutralizing their damaging effects.

Genetics

Inherited mutations in the UROD gene cause about 20% of cases (the other 80% of cases do not have mutations in UROD, and are classified as sporadic). UROD makes an enzyme called uroporphyrinogen III decarboxylase, which is critical to the chemical process that leads to heme production. The activity of this enzyme is usually reduced by 50% in all tissues in people with the inherited form of the condition.

Nongenetic factors such as excess iron or partially genetic factors such as alcohol use disorder and others listed above can increase the demand for heme and the enzymes required to make heme. The combination of this increased demand and reduced activity of uroporphyrinogen decarboxylase disrupts heme production and allows byproducts of the process to accumulate in the body, triggering the signs and symptoms of porphyria cutanea tarda.

The HFE gene makes a protein that helps cells regulate the absorption of iron from the digestive tract and into the cells of the body. Certain mutations in the HFE gene cause hemochromatosis (an iron overload disorder). People who have these mutations are also at an increased risk of developing porphyria cutanea tarda.

In the 20% of cases where porphyria cutanea tarda is inherited, it is inherited in an autosomal dominant pattern, which means one copy of the altered gene is sufficient to decrease enzyme activity and cause the signs and symptoms of the disorder.

Other
While inherited deficiencies in uroporphyrinogen decarboxylase often lead to the development of PCT, there are a number of risk factors that can both cause and exacerbate the symptoms of this disease. One of the most common risk factors observed is infection with the Hepatitis C virus.  One review of a collection of PCT studies noted Hepatitis C infection in 50% of documented cases of PCT. Additional risk factors include alcohol use disorder, excess iron (from iron supplements as well as cooking on cast iron skillets), and exposure to chlorinated cyclic hydrocarbons and Agent Orange.

It can be a paraneoplastic phenomenon.

Exacerbating factors
 Alcohol
 Estrogen
 Iron
 Hepatitis C virus

Pathogenesis
Porphyria cutanea tarda is primarily caused by uroporphyrinogen decarboxylase deficiency (UROD).  Uroporphyrinogen decarboxylase occurs in nature as a homodimer of two subunits.  It participates in the fifth step in heme synthesis pathway, and is active in the cytosol.  This enzymatic conversion results in coproporphyrinogen III as the primary product.  This is accomplished by the clockwise removal of the four carboxyl groups present in the cyclic uroporphyrinogen III molecule. Therefore, a deficiency in this enzyme causes the aforementioned buildup of uroporphyrinogen and hepta-carboxylic porphyrinogen, and to a lesser extent hexa-carboxylic porphyrinogen, and penta-carboxylic porphyrinogen in the urine, which can be helpful in the diagnosis of this disorder.

The dermatological symptoms of PCT that include blistering and lesions on sun-exposed areas of the skin are caused by a buildup of porphyrin compounds (specifically uroporphyrinogen) close to the surface of the skin that have been oxidized by free radicals or sunlight. The oxidized porphyrins initiate degranulation of dermal mast cells, which release proteases that catabolize the surrounding proteins.  This begins a cell-mediated positive feedback loop which matches the description of a type 4 delayed hypersensitivity reaction.  The resulting blisters, therefore, do not appear immediately but begin to show up 2–3 days after sun exposure.  Due to the highly conjugated structure of porphyrins involving alternating single and double carbon bonds, these compounds exhibit a deep purple color, resulting in the discoloration observed in the skin. Excess alcohol intake decreases hepcidin production which leads to increased iron absorption from the gut and an increase in oxidative stress. This oxidative stress then leads to inhibition of uroporphyrinogen decarboxylase, creating an excess of uroporphyrinogen III which is oxidized from the relatively harmless porphyrinogens into their oxidized porphyrins form.  Concentrated instances of oxidative stress (alcohol, physical trauma, psychological stress, etc.) cause the liver to hemorrhage these porphyrins into the blood stream where they are then susceptible to oxidation.

The strong association of PCT with Hepatitis C virus infection is not entirely understood. Studies have suggested that the cytopathic effect of the virus on hepatocytes can lead to the release of free iron.  This iron can disrupt the activity of cytochrome p450, releasing activated oxygen species.  These can oxidize the UROD substrate uroporphyrinogen, which can result in the inhibition of UROD and lead to deficient activity of this key enzyme.

Excess alcohol use is frequently associated with both inducing PCT and aggravating a preexisting diagnosis of the disorder.  It is thought to do so by causing oxidative damage to liver cells, resulting in oxidized species of uroporphyrinogen that inhibit the activity of hepatic UROD.  It is also felt to increase the uptake of iron in liver cells, leading to further oxidation of uroporphyrinogen by the release of activated oxygen species. Additionally, exposure to chlorinated cyclic hydrocarbons can lead to a deficiency in the activity of uroporphyrinogen decarboxylase, causing the buildup of excess uroporphyrinogen. Additionally, alcohol has been shown to increase the activity of the delta-aminolevulinic acid synthetase (ALA synthetase), the rate-limiting enzymatic step in heme synthesis in the mitochondria, in rats. Therefore, alcohol consumption may increase the production of uroporphyrinogen, exacerbating symptoms in individuals with porphyria cutanea tarda.

Diagnosis
While the most common symptom of PCT is the appearance of skin lesions and blistering, their appearance is not conclusive. Laboratory testing commonly reveals high levels of uroporphyrinogen in the urine, clinically referred to as uroporphyrinogenuria.  Additionally, testing for common risk factors such as hepatitis C and hemochromatosis is strongly suggested, as their high prevalence in patients with PCT may require additional treatment.  If clinical appearance of PCT is present, but laboratories are negative, the diagnosis of pseudoporphyria should be seriously considered.

Classification
Some sources divide PCT into two types: sporadic and familial. Other sources include a third type, but this is less common.

One study used 74% as the cutoff for UROD activity, with those patients under that number being classified as type II, and those above classified as type III if there was a family history, and type I if there was not.

Genetic variants associated with hemochromatosis have been observed in PCT patients, which may help explain inherited PCT not associated with UROD.

Treatment
Since PCT is a chronic condition, a comprehensive management of the disease is the most effective means of treatment.  Primarily, it is key that patients diagnosed with PCT avoid alcohol consumption, iron supplements, excess exposure to sunlight (especially in the summer), as well as estrogen and chlorinated cyclic hydrocarbons, all of which can potentially exacerbate the disorder.  Additionally, the management of excess iron (due to the commonality of hemochromatosis in PCT patients) can be achieved through phlebotomy, whereby blood is systematically drained from the patient. A borderline iron deficiency has been found to have a protective effect by limiting heme synthesis.  In the absence of iron, which is to be incorporated in the porphyrin formed in the last step of the synthesis, the mRNA of erythroid 5-aminolevulinate synthase (ALAS-2) is blocked by attachment of an iron-responsive element (IRE) binding cytosolic protein, and transcription of this key enzyme is inhibited.

Low doses of antimalarials can be used. Orally ingested chloroquine is completely absorbed in the gut and is preferentially concentrated in the liver, spleen, and kidneys. They work by removing excess porphyrins from the liver via increasing the excretion rate by forming a coordination complex with the iron center of the porphyrin as well as an intramolecular hydrogen bond between a propionate side chain of the porphyrin and the protonated quinuclidine nitrogen atom of either alkaloid. Due to the presence of the chlorine atom, the entire complex is more water-soluble allowing the kidneys to preferentially remove it from the blood stream and expel it through urination. Chloroquine treatment can induce porphyria attacks within the first couple of months of treatment due to the mass mobilization of porphyrins from the liver into the blood stream. Complete remission can be seen within 6–12 months as each dose of antimalarial can only remove a finite amount of porphyrins and there are generally decades of accumulation to be cleared. Originally, higher doses were used to treat the condition but are no longer recommended because of liver toxicity. Finally, due to the strong association between PCT and Hepatitis C, the treatment of Hepatitis C (if present) is vital to the effective treatment of PCT.
Chloroquine, hydroxychloroquine, and venesection are typically employed in the management strategy.

Epidemiology
PCT prevalence is estimated at 1 in 10,000. An estimated 80% of porphyria cutanea tarda cases are sporadic. The exact frequency is not clear because many people with the condition never experience symptoms and those that do are often misdiagnosed with anything ranging from idiopathic photodermatitis and seasonal allergies to hives.

Society and culture
Porphyria cutanea tarda is implicated in the origin of vampire myths. This is because people with the disease tend to avoid the sun due to photosensitivity and may develop disfigurement that eats away their noses, eyelids, lips, and gums giving their teeth a fang-like appearance. It has also been suggested they may have developed a craving for healthy blood to replace their own in a self medicated treatment in prior centuries.

Some folklore scholars claim that this is a mistake, first suggested in the 1990s, because vampires of myth did not have photosensitivity, nor were they described as looking like the modern incarnation of vampires. They were described as unintelligent roaming beings who fed on their victims to the point that they became reddened and heavily bloated, fattened on blood. Fangs were very rarely mentioned. Photosensitivity was not added to the vampire mythology until the 1922 film Nosferatu. Count Dracula of Bram Stroker's novel could walk about freely in daylight unharmed but not as powerful in the book.

Porphyria cutanea tarda is the name of a song by the rock band AFI on their fourth album Black Sails in the Sunset, released on May 18, 1999.

Porphyria cutanea tarda is the disease that both Dabney Pratt and Brother Rush suffer from in Virginia Hamilton's children's novel Sweet Whispers, Brother Rush.

References

External links 
 

Alcohol and health
Autosomal dominant disorders
Hepatitis C virus-associated diseases
Porphyrias
Skin conditions resulting from errors in metabolism